A pin-up is a photograph, usually printed in a magazine or other publication, of a sexually attractive person (often nude or provocatively dressed), and intended to be removed and pinned up on a wall.

Pin-Up  or pinup(s) may also refer to:
Pin Ups, a 1973 album by David Bowie
Pinups (Human Drama album)
Pinups magazine, a triannual artist's publication playing on historical centerfold practice
Pin-Up Magazine, a biannual architecture and design magazine
Pinups, a band related to Adolescents, and one of their albums

See also
Jessica Sutta or Pin-Up Doll, member of the Pussycat Dolls
Patsy Fagan or Pin-Up Boy, Irish snooker player